Friction blisters are a skin condition that may occur at sites of combined pressure and friction (such as the hands or feet), and may be enhanced by heat, moisture, or cotton socks. Friction blisters are characterized by vesicles or bullae.

See also 
 Coma blister
 Skin lesion
 List of cutaneous conditions

References

External links 

Skin conditions resulting from physical factors